The Santa Barbara Breakers are a pro minor league basketball team that played in the West Coast Professional Basketball League (WCBL) and the (IBL). The team played their home games on the campus of Santa Barbara City College.

History
The Breakers' maiden season began on April 13, 2007 in the International Basketball League. The team featured several former NBA players, such as Toby Bailey, Fred Vinson, Samaki Walker and Lamond Murray. Their regular season record was 17-6 and they lost in the IBL West Division Championship to the eventual 2007 IBL Champion, Portland.

In 2008, the Breakers switched affiliation to the newly-formed West Coast Pro Basketball League (WCBL). Santa Barbara was the inaugural season WCBL champion finishing undefeated at 18-0. Former UCSB shooting guard Josh Merrill was named the league's regular season and playoff MVP.

The WCBL competed for 9 years, 2008-2016. The Santa Barbara Breakers and the WCBL All Stars traveled to China 12 times for month long tours, playing CBA and International opponents. They also toured to Holland and Mexico for tournaments.

Notable players
Zach Andrews
James Nunnally
Greg Somogyi
Nick Young
Lamond Murray
Terrell Owens
Byron Russell
Jalen Rose
Jonathon Gipson

References

External links
Official website
Team profile at Eurobasket.com

2007 establishments in California
Basketball teams established in 2007
Basketball teams in California
Sports in Santa Barbara, California